Guido da Verona (the pseudonym of Guido Verona; 7 May 1881Milan, 5 April 1939) was an Italian poet and novelist.

Born in Saliceto Panaro to a Jewish family, Verona started his career as a poet in 1901 with the poetry collection Commemorazione del fatto d'arme di Brichetto, followed by I frammenti d'un poema (1902) and Bianco amore (1907).

He gained a larger popularity as a novelist, starting from 1911 when he published his first novel Colei che non si deve amare, considered among the most representative examples of the Italian Feuilleton. He later was the most commercially successful Italian writer between 1914 and 1939: particularly his novel Mimì Bluette, fiore del mio giardino, which reached 300,000 copies in 1922, an impressive run in Italy where illiteracy characterized the majority of the population.

He was a signatory to the Manifesto of Fascist intellectuals in 1925; in 1929 he published a parody novel of Alessandro Manzoni's The Betrothed, that actually was an implicit satire against fascism. 
 
He became an intellectual unpopular with the Fascist regime and marginalized after the approval of racial laws. Da Verona committed suicide in Milan at age 57.

References

External links
 
 

1881 births
1939 suicides
Religious leaders from the Province of Modena
Italian male poets
Suicides in Milan
Italian male novelists
20th-century Italian poets
20th-century Italian novelists
Jewish Italian writers
20th-century Italian male writers
20th-century pseudonymous writers
Suicides by Jews during the Holocaust
Italian Jews who died in the Holocaust